Goran Georgievski - Mujo was a police commander in the special police unit Lions.

Death
He was gunned down in front of a local nightclub in his home town. He was buried at Kumanovo Town Cemetery. The eulogy at his funeral was given by Lions spokesman Toni Mihajlovski, journalist Mirka Velinovska, actor Kiril Pop Hristov and others.

References

1969 births
2005 deaths
Macedonian Christians
Macedonian police officers
People from Kumanovo
People murdered in North Macedonia
Deaths by firearm in North Macedonia